Norman Beeston (29 September 1900 – 4 February 1985) was an Australian cricketer. He played in seven first-class matches for Queensland between 1924 and 1928.

Cricket career
Beeston played for South Brisbane in Brisbane Grade Cricket and was receiving praise for his batting in the press in January 1923. He was selected in a trial cricket match to select the Queensland state team in November 1923, and in November 1924 some expressed frustration that Beeston had not been selected to represent the Queensland state side.

See also
 List of Queensland first-class cricketers

References

External links
 

1900 births
1985 deaths
Australian cricketers
Queensland cricketers
Cricketers from Brisbane